Benjamin Becker was the defending champion, but he did not compete that year.

Last year's runner up Ruben Bemelmans won the tournament, defeating Tim Pütz in the final 7–6(7–3),  6–3.

Seeds

Draw

Finals

Top half

Bottom half

References 
 Main Draw
 Qualifying Draw

2014 ATP Challenger Tour
2014 Singles